Aleksandr Khachatryan (born November 7, 1947), is an Armenian actor. He is known for his role on The Leaders.

Film studioes
Aleksandr Khachatryan has acted in many films of Film studios of the Soviet Union.
 Armenfilm
 Mosfilm
 Lenfilm
 Belarusfilm
 Tajikfilm

Filmography

External links

References

1947 births
Living people
Male actors from Yerevan
Armenian male film actors
21st-century Armenian male actors
Armenian male stage actors